Jump Incorporated were an Australian rock band founded in 1985 by Geoff Gray (bass guitar, vocals), Martin Sinkovic (drums, vocals), his sister Nada Sinkovic (keyboards, vocals) and Mark Woods (guitar, vocals). All four were members of Moving Parts and Sirens. In late 1986 they added Lee Borkman (keyboards) and Finbar O'Hanlon (lead guitar). They released one full length album, Push Push One Day Too Far, in 1986. Their debut single "Sex and Fame" was produced by Mark Opitz and engineered by Alan Wright. Opitz won the 1987 ARIA Music Award for Producer of the Year for this single and four other releases. Alan Wright won the award for Engineer of the Year for this single.

History 

Jump Incorporated were formed in 1985 in Sydney by Geoff Gray on bass guitar and vocals, Martin Sinkovic on drums and vocals, his sister Nada Sinkovic on keyboards and vocals and Mark Woods on lead guitar and vocals. The group evolved from a school-based band Moving Parts formed in 1978, which included Gray, Martin and Woods – all from Camden High School – as a dance, pop group. In the following year Nada joined but they disbanded in 1980. They reconvened in 1983 but name confusion with rival Australian group Moving Pictures resulted in another change to the Sirens before they settled for Jump Incorporated as a rock band.

The group were signed to Mushroom Records and Mark Opitz produced their debut single, "Sex and Fame", which was issued in January 1986. Australian musicologist Ian McFarlane described its sonation as "mixed heavy guitars, anthemic choruses and glam-rock sleaze over a throbbing disco beat." It peaked at No. 23 on the Australian Kent Music Report singles chart. At the 1987 ARIA Music Awards Opitz won Producer of the Year for "Sex and Fame" and four other releases, while Alan Wright won Engineer of the Year for his work on that single.

Jump Incorporated's sole studio album Push Push One Day Too Far appeared in 1986, which was also produced by Opitz. It provided additional singles "Never Needed You More" (September 1986), "Turn It On" (April 1987) and "Jagged" (June 1987). The line-up was augmented in late 1986 by Lee Borkman on keyboards and Finbar O'Hanlen on lead guitar. They continued for a year before disbanding.

Discography

Studio albums

Singles

References

Australian rock music groups
Musical groups established in 1985
Musical groups disestablished in 1987
Musical groups from Sydney
1985 establishments in Australia